Pryiutivka is an urban-type settlement in Oleksandriia Raion of Kirovohrad Oblast in Ukraine. It is located on the banks of the Inhulets, a right tributary of the Dnieper, and is adjacent to the city of Oleksandriia. Pryiutivka hosts the administration of Pryiutivka settlement hromada, one of the hromadas of Ukraine. Population:

Economy

Transportation
Korystivka railway station is located in the settlement. It is a railway junction connecting three lines, to Znamianka, Kremenchuk, and Piatykhatky. There is some passenger traffic through the station.

The settlement has road access to Olexandriia, where it has further access to highways M30 to Kropyvnytskyi, M22 to Kremenchuk and Poltava, and M04 to Dnipro,

References

Urban-type settlements in Oleksandriia Raion